Kobus Brand (born 10 June 1994) is a Namibian first-class cricketer.

References

External links
 

1994 births
Living people
Namibian cricketers
People from Keetmanshoop